The 2017 Pan American Wrestling Championships was held in Salvador da Bahia, Brazil, from 5 to 7 May 2017.

Medal table

Team ranking

Medal summary

Men's freestyle

Men's Greco-Roman

Women's freestyle

References 
 Results 

Pan America
Pan American Wrestling Championships
2017 Pan American Wrestling Championships
Sports competitions in Brazil
Pan American Wrestling Championships